Mitsurugi is a Japanese surname.

Kanji
The name Mitsurugi consists of two elements: mi, whose meaning differs based on the kanji used to write it (for example  meaning "beautiful",  meaning "three", or  meaning "heavenly"), and tsurugi, a kind of sword (which might be written , or with variants like  or ).

People
, Japanese manga artist

Fictional characters
 in the Soulcalibur series of video games
 in the Variable Geo series of video games
 in the light novel series KonoSuba

References

Japanese-language surnames